Macaluso is a surname. Notable people with the surname include:

Christie Macaluso (born 1945), American Roman Catholic bishop
Damián Macaluso (born 1980), Uruguayan footballer
Emanuele Macaluso (1924–2021), Italian trade unionist, politician, and journalist
Jerry Macaluso, American toy designer and film producer
John Macaluso (born 1968), American drummer
Joseph Macaluso (born 1931), Canadian politician
Joseph N. Macaluso, Sr. (born 1928), American musician
Leonard Macaluso, American football player
Luigi Macaluso (1948–2010), Italian businessman
Mike Macaluso (born 1951), American basketball player
Stefano Macaluso (born 1975), Italian businessman